Revenge Is My Name is the first studio album by Belgian band Iron Mask, released on December 31, 2002 by Lion Music. All songs were composed by Dushan Petrossi.

Track listing
 "Enemy Brother Overture" – 0:57
 "Revenge Is My Name" – 4:42
 "March of Victory" – 5:12
 "The Witch Burner" – 4:51
 "Alien Pharao" – 5:06
 "Dimension X" – 0:50
 "Morgana's Castle" – 5:11
 "You Are My Blood" – 5:13
 "The Wolf and the Beast" – 8:13
 "Secret Tunnel of the King" – 2:47
 "Hold the Light" – 4:47
 "Warchild Requiem" – 2:51

Personnel
Dushan Petrossi - all electric and acoustic guitars, keyboards, backing vocals, timpani 
Phil Letawe - lead and backing vocals
Vassili Moltchanov - bass, flute
Youri Degroote - keyboards, piano, harpsichord, backing vocals, first lead vocal on 9, voice from space on 6
Anton Arkhipov - drums
Marie-Carmen Mendez - violin
Andrew Martin - clarinet
Paul Lemoine - contra bass
Michel Rossi - orchestra belga conducting
Roma Siadletski - backing vocals
Madi Hoffman - backing vocals
Sonia Algar - backing vocals
Sumer T. David - backing vocals
Lili Petrovski - backing vocals
Peter Dierickx - drums
Max Leclerq - lead vocals on 11
Guillaume Bideau (Mnemic, Scarve) - backing vocals on 11
Aymeric Ribot - keyboards on 11
Didier Chesneau - engineering and mixing on 9
Eric Philippe - artwork, logo, cover design

Production
Dushan Petrossi - production, mixing
Youri Degroote -  engineering, mixing, mastering

References

2002 debut albums
Iron Mask (band) albums